Asarums IF FK is a Swedish football club located in Asarum, Karlshamn Municipality.

Background
Asarums IF FK currently plays in Division 4 Blekinge which is the sixth tier of Swedish football. They play their home matches at the Asarums IP in Asarum.

The club is affiliated to Blekinge Fotbollförbund. Asarums IF have competed in the Svenska Cupen on 17 occasions.

Season to season

Footnotes

External links
 Asarums IF FK – Official website
 Asarums IF FK on Facebook

Football clubs in Blekinge County
Association football clubs established in 1954
1954 establishments in Sweden